The   were a class of twenty kaibōkan escort vessels built for the Imperial Japanese Navy during World War II.

Background
The  escort ship was developed after the start of the Pacific War, it became apparent that a design more capable of anti-submarine warfare than the previous  and  kaibōkan was needed. Despite being a simplified design, the Mikura-class vessels still took too long to construct, and due to the high attrition of Japan's destroyer and escort ships, action needed to be urgently taken to produce more ships in a quicker time. Furthermore, operational experience had shown that the Mikura-class was still very weak in its  anti-aircraft capability.

The first five of the new Ukuru-class were authorized under the 1941 Rapid Naval Armaments Supplement Programme and an additional six in the 1942 Modified 5th Naval Armaments Supplement Programme and nine under the 1944 Wartime Naval Armaments Supplement Programme. Twenty vessels were commissioned; two more (Urumi and Murotsu) were launched by Uraga Dock and completed in August 1945 but were still uncommissioned by the war’s end. In addition to these, nine units and two additional unfinished ships belong to a sub-class called the Hiburi class and are included in the table below.

Description
The Ukuru-class was a further simplification of the Mikura design. The hull was constructed using prefabricated sections which avoided the use of shaped steel or curved plates, which greatly reduced construction time. The curved plates on the bridge were also eliminated, and the smoke stacks were made of hexagonal elements instead of with a circular or oval cross-section. Internally, individual crew quarters were eliminated, becoming a communal area, and overall the construction was very spartan. These changes reduced construction time to under four months, although construction was often hindered by the lack of diesel engines.

The main battery was the same as on the Mikura-class, with three dual-purpose Type 10 120 mm AA guns one forward, and a twin mount aft, but the later ships in the class were fitted with modified gun shields. Anti-aircraft protection was by five triple-mount Type 96  anti-aircraft guns with two abreast the bridge, one of each side of the smokestack, and one aft on the deck house, along with a single-mount in front of the bridge. Some units received additional single-mount Type 96s, which were located on the forecastle. The Ukuru-class was equipped with the Type 22 and Type 13 radar. The Ukuru class was initially armed with 120 depth charges with two Type 94 depth charge projectors, sixteen Type 3 depth charge throwers and two depth charge chutes at the stern. The ships were provided with a Model 93 sonar and a Type 93 hydrophone; later units received the Type 3 Model 2 sonar, and some would later receive an  trench mortar.

Initially, the class retained capacity as a minesweeper, and was equipped with two paravanes; however, this was removed soon after completion.

Operational service
Despite being easy to build, they proved quite durable, with 11 occurrences of the class striking mines and only 3 sinking, one of which was after the war.

The Ukuru vessels were used extensively on convoy escort assignment in the South China Sea and East China Sea, where they frequently were attacked by Allied submarines or aircraft. However, despite their durability, they proved to be relatively ineffective against Allied submarines.

Surviving ships were used in the immediate postwar period as minesweepers and for repatriation. Five vessels survived to return to Japanese control, and were used as weather survey ships or as patrol ships, with the last being retired in 1966.

Ships

Twelve other ships were cancelled in 1945 - numbers #4706, #4708, #4710, #4713 to #4721. These included Murotsu and Urumi (both launched but incomplete); also cancelled (unstarted) were #5261, #5262, #5267 to #5284 (all of the Yaku group) from the Modified 5th Naval Armaments Supplement Programme. Also cancelled incomplete were two of the Hiburi class  - numbers #5265 (Ōtsu) and #5266 (Tomoshiri).

See also
Shimushu-class escort ship
Etorofu-class escort ship
Hiburi-class escort ship
Type C escort ship
Type D escort ship
Destroyer escort
Tacoma-class frigate
Flower-class corvette

Notes

References 

 http://www.combinedfleet.com/Kaibokan.htm (Retrieved April 30, 2009)
 http://admiral31.world.coocan.jp/e/stc0705.htm 
 https://web.archive.org/web/20110720174230/http://www.warshipsww2.eu/lode.php?language=E&period=&idtrida=1094 (Retrieved April 30, 2009)
 Worth, Richard, Fleets of World War II, Da Capo Press (2001), 

Escort ship classes